The Casa Garden is a small parkette located in Santo António, Macau, China. The area is the headquarters of the Macau delegation of the Orient Foundation.

History
Built in 1770, the park was originally the residence of a wealthy Portuguese merchant Manuel Pereira. At a later period, it was rented out to the English East India Company and was used to house the directors of the Macau branch of the company. In 2005, it was officially enlisted as part of the UNESCO World Heritage Site Historic Centre of Macau. Nowadays it is a cultural centre, which promotes a cross between Portuguese and Macau/Chinese art. In 2014 Sofia Areal had an exhibition in Casa Garden after a monthly residence in Macau. Coupled with an exhibition in Lisbon in 2015 in Museum of the Orient.

Architecture
The park contains the old residence, Old Protestant Cemetery and an art gallery.

See also
 List of tourist attractions in Macau

References

Pocket parks
Gardens in Macau
Historic Centre of Macau
Portuguese Macau
Buildings and structures completed in 1770
1770 in Asia
Portuguese colonial architecture in China